Cylindropectus is a genus of beetles in the family Carabidae, containing the following species:

 Cylindropectus cyaneus Mateu, 1974
 Cylindropectus griseus Mateu, 1974

References

Lebiinae